The cycling competitions at the 2017 Southeast Asian Games in Kuala Lumpur took place at Nilai and Putrajaya.

In 2017 edition, the competitions were featured in twenty events (men: 12 events & women: 8 events).

Venues

Events
The following events were contested:

Participation

Participating nations

Medal summary

Medal table

BMX events

Road events

Track events

See also
Cycling at the 2017 ASEAN Para Games

References

External links